Sofia Coppola is an American filmmaker and actress. She is best known for directing, producing, and writing such films as the psychological drama The Virgin Suicides (1999), the comedy drama Lost in Translation (2003), the period drama Marie Antoinette (2006), the coming of age film Somewhere (2010), the crime drama The Bling Ring (2013), the period drama The Beguiled (2017), and the comedy On the Rocks (2020). She also wrote, produced, and directed the Netflix Christmas musical comedy film A Very Murray Christmas (2015).

Throughout her career, Coppola earned nominations for three Academy Awards and two Golden Globe Awards, winning one of each. She was also nominated for three British Academy Film Awards and a Primetime Emmy Award. In 2004, Coppola became the third woman to be nominated for an Academy Award for Best Director. In 2010, she was the first American woman (and fourth American filmmaker) to win the Golden Lion, the top prize at the Venice Film Festival. In 2017, she became the second woman to receive Best Director at the Cannes Film Festival.

Major associations

Academy Awards

British Academy Film Awards

Golden Globe Awards

Independent Spirit Awards

Primetime Emmy Awards

Festival awards

Cannes Film Festival

Venice Film Festival

Guild awards

Directors Guild of America Awards

Producers Guild of America Awards

Writers Guild of America Awards

Critics awards

References 

Lists of awards received by film director
Lists of awards received by writer